Truworths is a Cape Town-based, South African clothing retailer, with 728 stores in South Africa, and 49 elsewhere in Africa.

Founded as The Alliance Trading Company in 1917, Truworths sells clothing under a number of different brands, including Truworths Man, UZZI, and LTD, employs over 11,000 people, and generates over R18 billion in annual revenue.

In December 2015, Truworths acquired the UK shoe chain Office Holdings for £256 million.

References

External links

Clothing retailers of South Africa
Companies based in Cape Town
Companies listed on the Johannesburg Stock Exchange
Retail companies of South Africa
South African brands